A small number of municipalities in Serbia held local elections in 2017. These were not part of the country's regular cycle of local elections but instead took place in certain jurisdictions where either the local government had fallen or the last local elections for four-year terms had taken place in 2013.

All local elections in Serbia in 2017 were held under proportional representation. Mayors were not directly elected but were instead chosen by elected members of the local assemblies. Parties were required to cross a five per cent electoral threshold (of all votes, not only of valid votes), although this requirement was waived for parties representing national minority communities.

Results

Vojvodina

Kovin
An election was held in Kovin on 23 April 2017, due to the expiry of the mandate of the previous assembly elected in 2013.

Incumbent mayor Sanja Petrović was chosen for another term in office after the election, with the support of thirty-eight delegates. The Socialists participated in the local government. Petrović resigned as mayor in early 2020 in order to harmonize Kovin's municipal elections with Serbia's general local election cycle and was appointed as leader of a provisional administration pending the vote.

Odžaci
An election was held in Odžaci on 23 April 2017. The previous election had been held in December 2013; sitting mayor Dušan Marijan resigned in early 2017 to harmonize the municipal election with the 2017 Serbian presidential election. Marijan initially led a provisional authority pending new elections; he was later replaced by Latinka Vasiljković.

Latinka Vasiljković was chosen as mayor after the election. She resigned in early 2020 to harmonize Odžaci's municipal elections with Serbia's general local election cycle; Goran Nikolić was appointed as the leader of a provisional authority pending the vote.

Vrbas
An election was held in Vrbas on 23 April 2017, following the resignation of mayor Milan Glušac of the Progressive Party. Vrbas had held its last local elections in 2013, and the assembly's term in office was scheduled to end in October 2017; Glušac said that he resigned in order to prompt early elections, which would be held in conjunction with the 2017 Serbian presidential election as a cost-saving measure.

Former mayor Milan Glušac was selected for another term in office after the election. He announced his resignation in November 2019, withdrew his resignation shortly thereafter, and definitively resigned in early 2020. He was subsequently appointed as the leader of a provisional authority pending new local elections in 2020. It was generally accepted that the timing of these activities was coordinated to harmonize Vrbas's local elections with the country's main electoral cycle.

Sumadija and Western Serbia

Kosjerić
Elections were held for the Municipal Assembly of Kosjerić on 24 April 2017, due to the expiry of the mandate of the previous assembly elected in 2013.

Žarko Đokić of the Serbian Progressive Party was chosen as mayor after the election.

References

Local elections in Serbia
2017 elections in Serbia